Vijaya Kumar Murty  (born 20 May 1956) is an Indo-Canadian mathematician working primarily in number theory. He is a professor at the University of Toronto and is the Director of the Fields Institute.

Early life and education
V. Kumar Murty is the brother of mathematician M. Ram Murty.

Murty obtained his BSc in 1977 from Carleton University and his PhD in mathematics in 1982 from Harvard University under John Tate.

Career
From 1982 to 1987, he held research positions at the Institute for Advanced Study at Princeton, Concordia University, and the Tata Institute of Fundamental Research. In 1987, he was appointed as Associate Professor at the Downtown campus of the University of Toronto, and 1991 he was promoted to Full Professor. In 2001, he was deputed to the Mississauga campus to serve a two-year term as Associate Chair of Mathematics, and from 2004 to 2007 he served as the inaugural Chair of the newly-created Department of Mathematical and Computational Sciences at the Mississauga campus. Twice he was Chair of the Department of Mathematics at the University of Toronto Downtown campus (2008-2013 and 2014-2017).

Murty became the director of Fields Institute in 2019.

Murty has served on the Canadian Mathematical Society Board of Directors and as vice president of the Canadian Mathematical Society.

Research 
Murty’s research is in areas of analytic number theory, algebraic number theory, information security, and arithmetic algebraic geometry. He and his brother, M. Ram Murty, have written more than 20 joint papers.

In 2020, Murty received a $666,667 grant from the Canadian Institutes of Health Research (CIHR) for setting up the COVID-19 Mathematical Modelling Rapid Response Task Force, a network of experts who will work to predict outbreak trajectories for the disease, measure public health interventions and provide real-time advice to policy-makers. It’s one of eight COVID-19 research projects at the University of Toronto.

Awards
Murty was elected a Fields Institute Fellow in 2003. Murty received the Coxeter–James Prize in 1991 from the Canadian Mathematical Society. He was elected to the Royal Society of Canada in 1995. In 1996, he, along with his brother, M. Ram Murty, received the Ferran Sunyer i Balaguer Prize for the book "Non-vanishing of L-functions and their applications."

In 2018, the Canadian Mathematical Society listed him in their inaugural class of fellows. He was named a Fellow of the American Mathematical Society, in the 2022 class of fellows, "for contributions to number theory, including the theory of L-functions associated to modular forms, and arithmetic geometry, and for service to the profession".

References

External links
Vijaya Kumar Murty: Home Page—University of Toronto, Department of Mathematics.

1956 births
Living people
Canadian mathematicians
20th-century Indian mathematicians
Harvard University alumni
Carleton University alumni
Canadian people of Indian descent
Fellows of the Canadian Mathematical Society
Number theorists
Fellows of the American Mathematical Society